The 1988–89 Toronto Maple Leafs season was Toronto's 72nd season in the National Hockey League (NHL). Toronto made a late season push for the playoffs under interim head coach (and former captain) George Armstrong but an overtime loss in the final regular season game at the Chicago Blackhawks kept them out of the postseason for the first time since 1984–85.

Off-season

NHL Draft

Regular season
The 1988–89 Maple Leafs season was a disastrous one that saw John Brophy fired as head coach midway through the season. Interim head coach George Armstrong led the Leafs close to the playoffs, but they eventually missed out after losing to the Chicago Blackhawks in the final game of the regular season. The Leafs needed a win against Chicago to clinch a playoff berth, but a Troy Murray overtime goal ended Toronto's season.

The Maple Leafs finished the regular season last in the NHL in power play goals scored (56), power play opportunities (334), power play percentage (16.77%) and penalty-killing percentage (72.70%).
 November 7, 1988 – The Maple Leafs traded RW Russ Courtnall to Montreal for RW John Kordic and a 6th-round choice (Michael Doers)
 Ken Wregget was traded by Maple Leafs to Philadelphia Flyers for two first-round picks (RW Rob Pearson and D Steve Bancroft) in 1989 draft, March 6, 1989.

Final standings

Schedule and results

Playoffs
The Maple Leafs did not qualify for the playoffs.

Player statistics

Forwards
Note: GP= Games played; G= Goals; AST= Assists; PTS = Points; PIM = Points

Defencemen
Note: GP= Games played; G= Goals; AST= Assists; PTS = Points; PIM = Points

Goaltending
Note: GP= Games played; W= Wins; L= Losses; T = Ties; SO = Shutouts; GAA = Goals Against

Transactions
The Maple Leafs have been involved in the following transactions in the 1988–89 season.

Trades

Waivers

Free agents

Awards and records
 Gary Leeman, Molson Cup (Most game star selections for Toronto Maple Leafs)

References
 Maple Leafs on Hockey Database

Toronto Maple Leafs seasons
Toronto Maple Leafs season, 1988-89
Toronto